The 1995 Benson and Hedges Open was a men's tennis  tournament held in Auckland, New Zealand and played on outdoor hard courts. The event was part of the World Series of the 1995 ATP Tour. It was the 28th edition of the tournament and was held from 9 January through 16 January 1995. Unseeded Thomas Enqvist won the singles title.

Finals

Singles

 Thomas Enqvist defeated  Chuck Adams 6–2, 6–1
 It was Enqvist's 1st title of the year and the 3rd of his career.

Doubles

 Grant Connell /  Patrick Galbraith defeated  Luis Lobo /  Javier Sánchez, 6–4, 6–3
 It was Connell's 1st title of the year and the 12th of his career. It was Galbraith's 1st title of the year and the 20th of his career.

References

External links
 
 ATP – tournament profile
 ITF – tournament edition details

Heineken Open
Heineken Open
ATP Auckland Open
January 1995 sports events in New Zealand